Eccoptocarpha is a genus of African plants in the grass family. The only known species is Eccoptocarpha obconiciventris, native to Tanzania and Zambia.

References

Panicoideae
Monotypic Poaceae genera
Flora of Africa